Hasasaneh may refer to:
 Hasasaneh-ye Bala
 Hasasaneh-ye Pain